Virgin and Child is a representation in art of Mary with her child Jesus.

Virgin and Child may also refer to:
 "The Virgin and Child" (song), a 15th-century English Christmas carol
 Virgin and Child (David), an oil painting of around 1520 by Gerard David
 Virgin and Child (Filocamo), an Italian wall painting by Antonio Filocamo
 Virgin and Child (after van der Goes?), a c. 1485–90 triptych
 The Virgin and Child (The Northbrook Madonna), a painting by the Master of the Northbrook Madonna
 Virgin and Child (Rubens), a painting by Rubens completed between 1608 and 1621
 Virgin and Child (Sirani), an 1663 oil painting by Elisabetta Sirani
 Virgin and Child (van der Weyden) a painting by Rogier van der Weyden in 15th century

See also
 Madonna and Child (disambiguation)
 Virgin and Child with Saint Anne (disambiguation)